Curtiss A (born Curt Almsted on January 31, 1951) is a musician and visual artist from Minneapolis. One of the original artists on the Twin/Tone Records label, he performs one of the most popular shows in the Twin Cities, an annual tribute to John Lennon held at First Avenue. He was the first musician to headline at First Avenue's sister club 7th Street Entry, and opened for Prince's first concert at First Avenue (then still called Uncle Sam's).

Career

Curtiss formed Wire, his first Twin Cities band, in 1969 and played with various permutations of that group through the 1970s. (Almsted's band is unrelated to the English post-punk band of the same name.) His first recording, a six-song EP, was with the Spooks, which he started with future Replacements guitarist Slim Dunlap.

In 1978, Curtiss (as Buzz Barker) released the single-cum-political rant "I Don’t Wanna Be President". Its B-side, "Land of the Free", was played at Solidarity rallies as the Polish trade union protested martial law. Following those classic singles, Twin/Tone released a full-length album in 1980. The acclaimed Courtesy received four stars in Rolling Stone. Curtiss followed with two more albums on Twin/Tone, The Damage is Done and A Scarlet Letter, the latter produced by Al Anderson of NRBQ. The next LP was to have been produced by Peter Holsapple and the dBs, but Curtiss took a break from performing following a family tragedy.

During his hiatus from music, Curtiss turned to making collages, an art form that has interested him since childhood and has fulfilled his desire “to see stuff that wasn’t together, together.”  He mixes all types and periods of art, particularly different styles of comic book illustrations.

Curtiss describes his collages as dreamscapes where iconic figures—or other images that embody a mythic quality—are placed in iconoclastic situations or surroundings.  He often uses political and theological images along with depictions of superheroes to represent the constant struggle for justice and to question who or what is truly good.  His work also has a great deal of humor, leaving the viewer with a mixture of despair and hope.

Since his return to music, Curtiss has released several albums, and he plays throughout the Twin Cities with his band, The Jerks of Fate.  His annual Lennon show is being documented by Twin Cities filmmaker Amy Buchanan.

Personal life
Almsted has four daughters; the third, Alyson, died in 1987 of sudden infant death syndrome. He has five grandchildren.

Honors and awards
Almsted has been honored with a star on the outside mural of the Minneapolis nightclub First Avenue, recognizing performers that have played sold-out shows or have otherwise demonstrated a major contribution to the culture at the iconic venue. Receiving a star "might be the most prestigious public honor an artist can receive in Minneapolis," according to journalist Steve Marsh.

Selected discography

 Courtesy (Twin/Tone, 1980)
 Damage Is Done (Twin/Tone, 1984) 
 Scarlet Letter (Twin/Tone, 1988)
 Jerks of Fate (independent, 2020)

Notes

References
Collins, Cyn. "Curtiss A prepares for his 31st annual John Lennon Tribute", City Pages, December 7, 2010.
McKinney, Devin. "The John & Curtiss Show", American Prospect, December 14, 2005.
Walsh, Jim. "When Yoko Met Curtiss", St. Paul Pioneer Press, December 4, 2000.

External links
 Official Curtiss A website
 Twin/Tone Records

Living people
1951 births
Guitarists from Minnesota
Artists from Minnesota